Ramanathapuram is a locality in Coimbatore city on the south eastern part of the city. It is one of the well developed neighborhoods in the city and has been part of Coimbatore Corporation since 1882.

Geography 
The nerve centre of Ramanathapuram is Trichy Road. This road passes through the centre point of Ramanathapuram. Other major roads include Puliakulam Road, Nanjundapuram Road, Sowripalayam Road, 80 Feet Road and Sungam Bypass Road. It is located about 4.6 km from Townhall, the centre of the city, 
9.9 km from the Coimbatore International Airport and about 4.1 km from City railway station, 5 km from Gandhipuram Central Bus Terminus and 8.7 km from Coimbatore Integrated Bus Terminus and 4.6 km from Podanur railway station and is well connected to local bus services to various parts of the city. Ramanathapuram shares its border with Town Hall, Singanallur, Puliakulam, Ukkadam, Racecourse, Sowripalayam and Nanjundapuram.

Infrastructure
The Trichy Road Flyover is under construction, to reduce the traffic congestion by bypassing Ramanathapuram and Sungam junctions.

Locality 
Ramanathapuram is one of the well connected localities in Coimbatore and has several educational,commercial and business establishments.

Schools
Schools like Trinity Matriculation School, Alvernia Matriculation School, Saradha Nursery and Primary School, Yellow Train Nursery school and Vivekalaya International School are schools located in and near Ramanathapuram.

Hospital
NM Hospital
Manu Hospital
Gem Hospital
Bala Hospital

Shops
Max
Titan

Business
Business Establishments like G.K. Industries, Ramani Realtors Private Limited and Angler technologies are located in Ramanathapuram.

Transport 
The nearest railway station to Ramanathapuram is the Coimbatore Junction 
Ramanathapuram has easy access to :
 Townhall : Via western Trichy Road
 Gandhipuram : Via Puliakulam Road
 Coimbatore Integrated Bus Terminus : Via Nanjundapuram Road
 Singanallur : Via  Eastern Trichy Road
 Railway Station : Via Western Trichy Road
Coimbatore International Airport : Via Puliakulam Road and Eastern Avinashi
Road

Politics 
The locality of Ramanathapuram is a part of Coimbatore South (State Assembly Constituency) partially and Singanallur (state assembly constituency) partially. Also the locality is a part of Coimbatore (Lok Sabha constituency).

Coimbatore Metro 
Coimbatore Metro feasibility study is completed and one of the route planned from Karanampettai to Thaneerpandal via Ramanathapuram  covering 42 km.

References

Neighbourhoods in Coimbatore